Tajai Massey, known by the stage name Tajai (born April 21, 1975), is an American rapper and producer. He is one of the four founding members of the Oakland, California-based underground hip hop group Souls of Mischief and, with Souls of Mischief, a part of the eight-person, alternative hip hop collective Hieroglyphics. He is also one half of the hip hop duo Rap Noir. He is a vegetarian.

Biography
Born in Stanford, California, Massey moved with his family to Oakland, California when he was 2 years old. With a professor for his mother and sysop for a father, he was in a well-educated household where he started computer programming at an early age. He and fellow Souls of Mischief member A-Plus experimented with the Commodore 32, Commodore 64, Apple IIe, and Apple II, among others.

He graduated from Stanford University in 1997 with a BA degree in anthropology.

Massey graduated with an MA in architecture from the UC Berkeley College of Environmental Design in 2014  and became an architectural designer for Sabi Design•Build starting in October 2014. In May 2017, he was part of a group that acquired the Hibiscus Garden Hotel in Lagartero/Santa Catalina, Panama.

Massey is a father of two. He speaks English, Spanish, and Swahili.

Musical career

Souls of Mischief
In elementary school, Tajai met fellow Souls of Mischief member A-Plus, and the duo began their nascent rap careers.  Tajai eventually introduced A-Plus to future Souls of Mischief members Phesto and Opio, and the group formed in high school before releasing their debut album, 93 'til Infinity on Jive Records in 1993.

Hieroglyphics
After Tajai and the Souls of Mischief were dropped by Jive, the group was incorporated into the Hieroglyphics in 1995, at the urging of Del tha Funkee Homosapien.

Tajai has contributed to all six Souls of Mischief albums, as well as the three Hieroglyphics studio albums.  He has also produced or performed on solo projects of various Hieroglyphics' members.

SupremeEx
In 1999, Tajai and the Hieroglyphics' then-webmaster StinkE, formed the conceptual group SupremeEx, which released an enhanced CD, Projecto: 2501, and in 2005, released the album Nuntype.

Crudo
Tajai is also a member of Crudo, a new project featuring Mike Patton and Dan the Automator, who made their live debut in 2008.

Rap Noir/Trap Noir
Tajai is also a member of Rap Noir, a hip hop duo with producer Unjust from Chosen Few. In mid 2017 they released their first single "Let it Rain." They released their debut album "Rap Noir" in 2018. Tajai also collaborated with producer Harris the Know-it-all to release a remix album called "Trap Noir."

Discography

Albums

Solo
 Power Movement (2005)
 Power Movement Remixes (2005)

With Souls of Mischief
93 'til Infinity (1993)
No Man's Land  (1995)
Focus (1997)
Trilogy: Conflict, Climax, Resolution (2000) 
Montezuma's Revenge (2009)
 There is Only Now (2014)

With Hieroglyphics
 3rd Eye Vision (1998)
 Full Circle (2003)
 The Kitchen (2013)

With SupremeEx
 Projecto: 2501 (2000)
 Nuntype (2000)

As Rap Noir
 Rap Noir {w/ Unjust} (10-31-2018)
 Trap Noir {w/ Harris the Knowitall} (10-31-2018)

Collaborations
 Hood Famous (2007 w/ Superstar Quamallah as Supastars)

Mixtapes
 Sleeping Giant
 Machine Language

References

External links
 Discogs Profile - Tajai
 Hieroglyphics, the collective's official website.

1975 births
Living people
Hieroglyphics (group) members
Rappers from Oakland, California
Stanford University alumni
21st-century American rappers
21st-century American male musicians